This table of bases gives the values of 0 to 256 in bases 2 to 36, using A−Z for 10−35.

"Base" (or "radix") is a term used in discussions of numeral systems which use place-value notation for representing numbers.

Base 10 is in bold.

See also 
 Numeral system
 List of numeral systems

References 

Numeral systems
Bases
Bases